Adesmia acuta is an endemic perennial shrub found in Argentina.

References

acuta
Flora of Argentina